The 2015–16 Big Bash League season (BBL|05) was the fifth season of the Big Bash League (BBL), the premier Twenty20 cricket competition in Australia. The tournament ran from 17 December 2015 to 24 January 2016.

The BBL title was won by the Sydney Thunder, who defeated the Melbourne Stars by three wickets in the final to claim their first title. The Perth Scorchers, who had been seeking a third successive title, lost to the Stars in the semi-final thus making this the only season to date that the Scorchers failed to make the final. Chris Lynn of the Brisbane Heat was the tournament's leading run-scorer, making 378 runs from eight matches, and was named player of the tournament. The leading wicket-taker was Clint McKay of the Thunder, who took 18 wickets from ten matches. Travis Head of the Adelaide Strikers was named the best player under 25, scoring 299 runs and taking six wickets.

Pre-season

Squads

Points Table

Points table

Summary

Round 1

Round 2

Round 3

Round 4

Round 5

Round 6

Round 7

Round 8

Knockout phase

Semi-finals
The top four teams from the group stage qualified for the semi finals.

Final

Statistics

Most runs

Source: ESPNcricinfo, 24 January 2016

Most wickets

Source: ESPNcricinfo, 24 January 2016.

Notable events

The opening Sydney Derby match was played for the "Batting for Change Trophy" at Spotless Stadium. The match saw both the sides earning money for the Batting for Change charity with every six hit. Players had pledged to donate a total of $775 for each six hit during the match, as part of the Batting for Change cause set up by Sydney Sixers' player Ryan Carters.

The January 2 match between Perth Scorchers and Sydney Sixers at The Furnace saw the clubs wearing Batman and Superman playing gear instead of their original gear as a part of BBL's new partnership with Warner Bros. Pictures.

TV audience
BBL games are currently broadcast in Australia by the free-to-air Network Ten. Network Ten's BBL coverage has become a regular feature of Australian summers and attracted an average audience of 1.13 million for each match in Australia this season, an 18% increase on the previous season. A cumulative audience of 9.65 million watched the BBL matches in Australia, out of which 39% were females.

The opening Sydney Derby match attracted more a peak audience of 1.53 million. A peak audience of 1.05 million watched the second innings of the match in the five major capital cities, making it then the highest-rating non-finals match in BBL history. This record was broken in the last match between Renegades and Strikers when Session 2 was watched by an average audience of 1.36 million, which peaked at 1.67 million.

The BBL Final was watched by an average audience of 1.79 million, which peaked at 2.24 million viewers. This was the first time that the ratings for a BBL match crossed the 2 million mark.

Following are the television ratings for 2015–16 BBL season in Australia.

Attendances

References

External links
Official fixtures
Series home at ESPN Cricinfo

Big Bash League seasons
Big Bash League
Big Bash League
2015–16 Big Bash League